Avittathur is a small village in Thrissur district of Kerala state, India. It was one of the 64 original Brahmin settlement in the Kerala state. It is famous for an ancient shiva temple, where 4 very old inscriptions have been discovered. According to legend, the temple was consecrated by sage agastya and the name of the village was originally agastyaputtur but it seems to be just the Sanskritization of the word. Legendary Chakyar Koothu and Koodiyattam maestro Nātyāchārya Vidūshakaratnam Padma Shri Māni Mādhava Chākyār used to perform here for decades.

References

External links 

avittathur gramam 
Avittathur Mahadeva Temple 

Irinjalakuda
Chalakudy
Thrissur
Kerala
Māni Mādhava Chākyār

Hindu pilgrimage sites in India
Villages in Thrissur district